Garvin Park is a historic public park located in Evansville, Indiana, United States. It was planned and laid out in 1915 for the city of Evansville in a naturalistic landscape style.  Located in the park are the contributing concrete and stone bridges and a Works Progress Administration-era bandstand.

It was listed on the National Register of Historic Places in 1980.

References

Parks in Indiana
Works Progress Administration in Indiana
Buildings and structures completed in 1915
Buildings and structures in Evansville, Indiana
National Register of Historic Places in Evansville, Indiana
Parks on the National Register of Historic Places in Indiana